Emmet Thomas "Red" Ormsby (April 3, 1895 – October 11, 1962) was a professional baseball umpire who worked in the American League from 1923 to 1941. Ormsby umpired 2,537 major league games in his 19-year career, in addition to working in the 1935 Major League Baseball All-Star Game, and in four World Series (1927, 1933, 1937, and 1940).

Pitching career
He posted a 14–13 win-loss record while playing for the Green Bay Bays. In , he pitched for Green Bay, Waterloo, and Omaha. He then served in the Marines during World War I.

Umpiring career
In , Ormsby started his umpiring career in the Illinois–Indiana–Iowa League. In 1927, he required a police escort from the field in Philadelphia after a foul ball ruling on a blast hit by Ty Cobb. Fans rioted after Cobb and Al Simmons were both ejected from the game. At a 1929 Philadelphia-Cleveland game, Ormsby sustained a concussion when was hit in the head by a glass bottle intended for another umpire.

During a Browns-White Sox contest in 1935, Ormsby was indirectly responsible for the start of Hall of Fame umpire Jocko Conlan's time as an arbiter. Ormsby was overcome by the heat during the game and injured White Sox player Conlan was asked to assume umpiring duties.

In December 1941, Ormsby was placed on the retired list with a pension. He had been in declining health for the last three years of his career.

Later life
He also worked with a county sheriff's department and was secretary on the Chicago Liquor License Appeal Board. He died on October 11, 1962, while raking leaves at his Chicago home.

References

1895 births
1962 deaths
Major League Baseball umpires
Sportspeople from Illinois
Green Bay Bays players
Waterloo Jays players
Omaha Rourkes players